On Paradise Drive is the second book written by conservative New York Times commentator David Brooks, released four years after his first book, Bobos in Paradise. Using a similar style, his second work seeks to make a connection between the oft-maligned material strivings of middle-class Americans and a more profound focus on one's future, which he believes to be deeply ingrained in American society.

See also 

The Social Animal
Bobos in Paradise

Notes 

2004 non-fiction books